Milorad Mitrovic (born 31 January 1949) is a Serbian professional football coach and a player. Mitrovic started his club playing career in his hometown FK Šumadija Aranđelovac, where he played through youth categories to senior team, competing in the Yugoslav Second League. His soccer reputation, however, was established as an accomplished coach with over 35 years of coaching experience in different European teams.

Education 
1967–1971   University of Belgrade, B.A. in Physical education in Belgrade in Serbia

1970 - 1971   Two Years specialization – Football Department under directorship of Professor  Vojin Rainović. Diploma granted

1983–1985   Diploma of seminar participation organized by Turkish Football Association under directorship of Director of Keln Football School, Mr. Gero Bisanz and Coach of West Germany Football Association, Mr. Jupp Derwall.

1971–1978   Specialization  Theoretical and Practical specialization in prestigious clubs in Serbia, Croatia, the Netherlands and Espania

 FC Red Star     -   Belgrad (Serbia)
 FC Partizan     -   Belgrad (Serbia)
 FC Dinamo       -   Zagreb  (Croatia)
 FC Hajduk       -   Split     (Croatia)
 FC Feyenoord     -   Rotterdam (Netherlands)
 FC Ajax         -   Amsterdam (Netherlands)
 FC Real Madrid  -   Madrid (Spain)

2008 - 2009    UEFA " Pro" licence coach FA Serbia

Professional Coaching Career and Working Experience 

 1973 - 1977 FC Šumadija                   -Aranđelovac, Serbia
 1973 - 1977 FC Šumadija                  - Aranđelovac, Serbia
 1977 - 1980 FC Radnički                 -  Pirot, Serbia
 1980 - 1981 FC Napredak                -   Kruševac, Serbia
 1981 - 1983 FC Eskisehirspor          -    Eskisehir, Turkey
 1983 - 1984 FC Altay                     - Izmir, Turkey
 1984 - 1985 FC Lirija                   -  Prizren, Serbia
 1985 - 1986 FC Eskisehir               -   Eskisehir, Turkey
 1986 - 1988 FC Samsunspor                 -Samsun, Turkey
 1988 - 1989 FC Eskisehirspor             - Eskisehir, Turkey
 1989 - 1990 FC Sakaryaspor              -  Sakarya, Turkey
 1990 - 1991 FC Samsunspor              -   Samsun, Turkey
 1992 - 1993 FC Keytan                 -    Kuwayt, Kuwayt
 1993 - 1994 FC Evagoras              -     Pafos, Cyprus
 1994 - 1995 FC APOP                 -      Pafos, Cyprus
 1995 - 1996 FC Altay               -       Izmir, Turkey
 1996 - 1997 FC Denizlispor        -        Denizli, Turkey
 1997 - 1998 FC Samsunspor        -         Samsun, Turkey
 1998 - 1999 FC Gaziantepspor    -          Gaziantep, Turkey
 1999 - 2000 FC Ankaragucu      -           Ankara, Turkey
 2000 - 2001 FC Dardanelspor   -            Canakale, Turkey
 2002 - 2003 FC Gaziantepspor -             Gaziantep, Turkey
 2003 - 2005 FC Elazigspor      -           Elazig, Turkey
 2005 - 2007 FC Dardanelspor   -            Canakale, Turkey
 2007 - 2010 FC Eskisehirspor -             Eskisehir, Turkey

References

External links 
Manager profile at TFF.org
 Profile

1949 births
Living people
Yugoslav football managers
Serbian football managers
Eskişehirspor managers
MKE Ankaragücü managers
Altay S.K. managers
Denizlispor managers
Elazığspor managers
Gaziantepspor managers
Sakaryaspor managers
Samsunspor managers